Following is a list of accidents and incidents experienced by Aeroflot during the 1980s. Both accidents combined left a death toll of 378 casualties and involved a Tupolev Tu-154, ranking as the worst ones involving the type, .

There were 15 deadly accidents involving more than 50 people killed during this decade. The total number of fatalities for the decade rose to 2,106. When these figures are compared with the ones for the previous decade, the number of people killed aboard Aeroflot aircraft reduced by 1450. Given that most of the events took place within the borders of the Soviet Union, the table below includes hull-loss accidents for which the number of casualties was not published, a common practice during the Soviet era, as only those accidents that took place within the Soviet Union in which there were foreigners involved, or those that occurred outside the country tended to be published or admitted. Given this, the figures for the number of fatalities for the decade might be higher.

During the decade, the airline lost 201 aircraft, split into 1 Avia 14, 8 Antonov An-12s, 93 Antonov An-2s, 10 Antonov An-24s, 8 Antonov An-26s, 1 Antonov An-28, 7 Ilyushin Il-14s, 2 Ilyushin Il-62s, 1 Ilyushin Il-76, 19 Let L-410s, 1 Tupolev Tu-104, 15 Tupolev Tu-134s, 14 Tupolev Tu-154s, 19 Yakovlev Yak-40s and 2 Yakovlev Yak-42s.

List

See also

Aeroflot accidents and incidents
Aeroflot accidents and incidents in the 1950s
Aeroflot accidents and incidents in the 1960s
Aeroflot accidents and incidents in the 1970s
Aeroflot accidents and incidents in the 1990s
Transportation in the Soviet Union

Footnotes

Notes

References

Lists of aviation accidents and incidents
1980s in the Soviet Union